The following is a Timeline of British Army and Royal Ulster Constabulary (RUC) undercover operations during Operation Banner during the 1969 – 1998 Northern Irish conflict in Northern Ireland that resulted in death or injury. Including operations by the SAS, 14 Intelligence Company, the Military Reaction Force (MRF), RUC Special Patrol Group and Special Branch.
Dates resulting in at least three or more deaths are marked in bold.

1970s

1972
15 April – Brothers Gerry and John Conway—both Catholic civilians—were walking along Whiterock Road to catch a bus. As they passed St Thomas's School, a car stopped, and three men leapt out and began shooting at them with pistols. The brothers ran, but both were shot and wounded. Witnesses said one of the gunmen returned to the car and spoke into a handset radio. Shortly afterward two armoured personnel carriers arrived, and there was a conversation between the uniformed and the plain clothes soldiers. The three vehicles then left, and the brothers were taken by ambulance to the Royal Victoria Hospital. The British Army told journalists that a patrol had encountered two wanted men, that one had fired at the patrol, and that the patrol returned fire. In a 1978 interview, a former MRF member claimed he had been one of the gunmen. On 1 December 2015 the PSNI listed this shooting as one of nine incidents it was investigating in relation to the activities of the British Army's Military Reaction Force (MRF). In 2020, the High Court ordered the MoD to pay compensation to the widow of John Conway. It also established that the Conway brothers were actually shot by a special unit from the King's Own Scottish Borderers (KOSB) led by Lieutenaunt Julian Ball.
6 May – An 18-year-old male was shot and injured at the Glen Road area of west Belfast, by the MRF.
7 May – A 15-year-old boy was shot and injured outside a disco in the Glen Road area of west Belfast by the MRF.
9 May – The MRF fired shots at a vehicle in the Kashmir Road area of west Belfast. Nobody was injured
12 May – Patrick McVeigh a 44 year old Catholic civilian was shot dead by the British Army's undercover MRF unit, at Riverdale Park South, Andersonstown, Belfast. Four other people were injured in the attack.
12 May – Later the same night Patrick McVeigh was shot and killed, the MRF shot and injured an 18-year-old man in the Slievegallion area of west Belfast.
26 May – The MRF shot and injured a 34-year-old man, in the Silvio Street area of north Belfast.
22 June – In the afternoon the MRF shot and injured four civilians in the Glen Road area of west Belfast.
26 June – 19 year old Catholic civilian Daniel Rooney was shot dead by the MRF, at St James Crescent, Falls Road, Belfast. Another 18-year-old man was also shot and injured in this shooting attack.
 In total at least two people were killed by the MRF between April – June 1972 with another 13 people being injured.
2 October – Attack on MRF – After extracting confessions from IRA Volunteers who were working for the MRF, the Provisional IRA Belfast Brigade attacked the Military Reaction Force. From the confessions of one of the IRA Volunteers, they found out the MRF had a number of front companies including the Four Square Laundry and the Gemini massage parlour on the Antrim Road. The Belfast Brigades 2nd Battalion lead by Brendan Hughes first attacked the Four Square Laundry van in the Twinbrook, Belfast area. Four Volunteers attacked the van and killed the driver who was an undercover soldier in the Royal Engineers, a MRF woman posing as Nationalist under attack from Loyalists escaped. The IRA claimed they machine-gunned and killed undercover operatives in the hidden roof part of the van, the 3rd Battalion of the brigade shot up the Massage Parlour. The IRA claimed they had killed five undercover soldiers, the British only admitted to one killing, the driver shot dead at Twinbrook.

1973
4 February – IRA Volunteer Tony Campbell (19), and civilians Ambrose Hardy (26), Brendan Maguire (33) and John Loughran (35) were shot dead by British undercover snipers in the New Lodge area of Belfast. See also: New Lodge Six shooting.

1974
14 April – Captain Anthony Pollen was shot dead by the IRA in Derry while carrying out undercover surveillance on a demonstration in the Bogside area.
3 August 1974 – Provisional IRA Belfast Brigade IRA volunteer Martin Skillen was shot dead by soldiers manning a British Army undercover post in Clonard cinema along the Falls Road.

1976
March 1976 – The SAS abducted Sean McKenna, an IRA volunteer wanted for attempted murder and a string of other offences. McKenna was abducted at 2:30 am while sleeping at home in Edentober, on the Republic's side of the border, in a cross-border raid by the SAS. Once across the border, he was officially arrested by another detachment of the British Army. McKenna wrote a statement in jail, "....they kicked the door down. One of them put a short against my head, it was a 9 mm Browning, he told me not to move or he would blow my head off.
16 April – IRA volunteer and Staff Officer in the Provisional IRA's South Armagh Brigade 1st Battalion, Peter Cleary was shot dead by the SAS in the south Armagh area near his sisters home in Forkhill.
5 May – The Irish Army and the Garda Síochána arrested an 8 man-strong SAS unit who were on a secret mission in Northern Ireland but passed over into County Louth in the Republic of Ireland by mistake. The SAS team were stopped at a Gardaí checkpoint, they had several SMG's and a shotgun in their car. At first the SAS commander was resisting to surrender to Gardaí in charge but once the Irish Army appeared out of the bushes the SAS laid down their weapons and were taken in custody.
2 November – The IRA shot dead undercover RUC member Noel McCabe while he sat in his car at the junction of the Falls Road and Clonard, Belfast.

1977
16 January – Provisional IRA South Armagh Brigade volunteer Seamus Harvey was shot dead by four SAS soldiers in Coolderry, Armagh.
15 May 1977 – Captain Robert Nairac was kidnapped while on an undercover mission in a south Armagh pub and shot by the IRA. He was driven across the border, beaten and shot, and his body buried in an unmarked grave. To this day nobody has found his corpse.
12 December – Irish National Liberation Army volunteer (INLA volunteer) Colm “Rooster” McNutt was shot dead by 14 Intelligence Company in the Bogside area of Derry.
14 December 1977 – Corporal Paul Harman was shot dead by the IRA in west Belfast. Harman was undercover when he stopped his red Morris Marina on Monagh Avenue. An IRA unit approached the car and shot him in the head and back and torched the car.

1978
26 February – IRA volunteer Paul Duffy was shot by the SAS at farmyard while retrieving an arms cache, in Ardboe, County Tyrone. Duffy was the first IRA volunteer to be shot dead by special forces outside of south Armagh.
17 March – During a gun battle between the SAS and IRA, in a field near Maghera, the IRA unit shot dead SAS Lance-Corporal David Jones and injured another soldier, the SAS shot and badly injured the IRA Commander for their South Derry Brigade and future hunger striker, Francis Hughes who was arrested after the gun battle.
10 June – IRA Vol. Denis Heaney was shot dead by soldiers from the 14 Intelligence Company while attempting to steal a car in the Bogside area of Derry.
21 June - An IRA active service unit of three Volunteers was shot and killed by the SAS while trying to plant a bomb in a post office on the Ballysillan Road, Belfast. The IRA volunteers killed were Denis Brown, William Mailey and John Mulvenna, they were the first IRA members killed by the SAS in Belfast. Also shot by the SAS was an Ulster Volunteer Force (UVF) member William Hanna.
11 July – The SAS shot dead 16 year old Catholic civilian John Boyle in Dunloy, County Antrim while he was standing near a Provisional IRA arms cache.
11 August – Lance Corporal Alan Swift was shot dead while undercover in the Bogside area of Derry City. Two IRA members fired into the corporal's car with automatic rifles.
30 September – The SAS shot dead Protestant civilian James Taylor in the Tyrone village of Coagh.
24 November – The SAS shot dead 50 year old Provisional IRA volunteer Patrick Duffy on the Maureen avenue near the Abercorn road in Derry.

1979
6 May 1979 – Sergeant Robert Maughan (30), from the 14 Intelligence Company and Norman Prue (29) an undercover RUC officer, were both shot dead as they sat in an unmarked parked car outside of a church in Lisnaskea by the IRA' South Fermanagh brigade.

1980s

1980
2 May – SAS Captain Herbert Richard Westmacott was killed by a unit of the Provisional IRA Belfast Brigade known as the "M60 Gang" during a shoot-out on the Antrim Road. Westmacott was one of the most senior British Army personnel to be killed by the IRA during Operation Banner and the most senior SAS man.

1981
28 May – IRA volunteers George McBrearty and Charles Maguire were shot dead by the 14 Intelligence Company in south Derry.

1982
11 November 1982 – The killing of three unarmed IRA members at an RUC checkpoint in east Lurgan, County Armagh, gave rise to allegations of a shoot-to-kill policy in Northern Ireland The volunteers killed were Sean Burns, Eugene Toman and Gervaise McKerr. It was later established they were killed by the RUC Special Patrol Group & the Headquarters Mobile Support Unit (HMSU) Three officers were acquitted of their murder in June 1984, the presiding judge, Lord Justice Maurice Gibson, commending them for their "courage and determination in bringing the three deceased men to justice – in this case, to the final court of justice."
24 November - The killing, by an RUC undercover unit, of Michael Tighe and the wounding of his friend Martin McCauley at an IRA arms cache on a farm near Lurgan, County Armagh, this killing provided more Sinn Féin propaganda for a shoot to kill policy.. (19 years later, McCauley was arrested in Colombia, accused by the Colombian authorities of teaching FARC guerillas in the use of explosives, in particular the "barrack buster"). 
12 December 1982 – At an RUC checkpoint in Mullacreevie, County Armagh, the same group of RUC SPG and HMSU that killed the three IRA Vols. in November, shot dead two of the INLA's Vols.Seamus Grew and Roddy Carroll. (The intended main target, Dominic McGlinchey, was not in their car as expected.) Just six days before this shooting the INLA carried out the Droppin Well bombing in County Londonderry killing 17 people, 11 soldiers and 6 civilians, it was the worst bombing in County Londonderry during the whole of the conflict from 1969 – 1998.

1983
2 February – INLA Volunteer Eugene McMonagle was shot dead by members of the 14 Intelligence company near Shantallow, County Londonderry.
13 August – undercover RUC men shot dead two INLA members, Gerard Mallon and Brendan Convery, as they were about to attack RUC officers in Dungannon.
4 December – IRA Vols. Brian Campbell and Com McGirrr were shot dead by the SAS in Clonoe, Tyrone.

1984
21 February - A gun battle broke out between an IRA unit and 14 Intelligence Company, in the battle IRA Vols Henry Hogan and Declan Martin were killed. One British undercover soldier, Sergeant Paul Oram, was killed in the gun battle and another soldier injured
2 December - An IRA unit from the Provisional IRA Derry Brigade was ambushed by the SAS in Kesh, west County Fermanagh. IRA volunteer Kieran Fleming was killed during the subsequent gun battle, Ciaran Fleming drowned in the Branagh River while two other IRA men were eventually captured. During the exchange of fire, Lance Corporal Alistair Slater, a PARA 1 soldier and SAS member, was hit and mortally wounded. See: Kesh ambush.
6 December  – Two IRA volunteers. William Fleming and Danny Doherty were shot in the grounds of Gransha Hospital of Clooney Road, Derry by the SAS while on a motor bike. William Fleming was the brother of Kieran Fleming who died four days earlier.

1985
23 February - A three-man IRA unit was ambushed and killed by the SAS in the County Tyrone town of Strabane. Those were killed were unit commander Charles Breslin, and brothers Michael and David Devine. At just 16 years old David Devine was the youngest IRA Volunteer to be killed by enemy forces. See: Strabane ambush.

1986
26 April – IRA Fermanagh Brigade Commander Séamus McElwaine was shot dead by the SAS while preparing an ambush near Rosslea, County Fermanagh. Another IRA Vol. Sean Lynch was badly injured during the incident.

1987
8 May 1987 - Loughgall Ambush – The IRA suffered it's heaviest lost since 1921 when it was ambushed at Loughgall police station by the SAS following a tip off giving information about the planned attack.It was one of the most experienced IRA units ever assembled including Volunteers like Jim Lynagh, Pádraig McKearney and Patrick Joseph Kelly who were all over 30 years of age at the time of the ambush, and who had carried out many high-profile actions before like the Attack on Ballygawley barracks, the Attack on RUC Birches barracks and the deaths of Norman Stronge and his son along with the burning of Tynan Abbey. A civilian called Oliver Hughes was caught up in the ambush and shot dead as well, his brother who was driving with him was also badly injured. Three SAS soldiers and two constables were wounded.
26 August 1987 - Volunteers from the Provisional IRA Belfast Brigade shot dead two on-duty plain clothes RUC officers at a bar, in the docks area of Belfast. One of the officers was a Protestant the other a Catholic. The IRA released a statement after the killings claiming the officers were part of the RUC Special Branch and that day they were carrying out surveillance on Republicans.

1988
6 March - Operation Flavius – Three unarmed IRA Volunteers were killed in Gibraltar by the SAS, those killed were Seán Savage, Daniel McCann, and Mairéad Farrell (all senior members of Provisional IRA Belfast Brigade)
19 March – Corporals killings – Undercover British Army corporals Derek Wood and David Howes were attacked by a mob at an IRA funeral  in Belfast and shot dead on waste ground by the IRA.
4 July – The SAS shot dead Protestant civilian Kenneth Stronge while driving his taxi past North Queen Street RUC station.
30 August - Ambush at Drumnakilly – Three IRA Volunteers were ambushed by the SAS while trying to carry out a killing of a UDR soldier. Those killed were brothers Gerard (29 years old) and Martin Harte (23), and their brother-in-law Brian Mullin (26) all from the East Tyrone Brigade.

1989
2 September 1989 – A female undercover British soldier shot dead Ulster Volunteer Force member Brian Robinson after he and another UVF member shot and killed a Catholic civilian on Crumlin Road in Belfast and made an escape on motor bike.

1990s

1990
13 January 1990 - Three Catholic men with no paramilitary links or political affiliation who were in the process of escaping after robbing a shop were shot dead by an undercover British army unit in west Belfast.
24 March – a gun battle erupted between an IRA unit and undercover British forces at Cappagh, County Tyrone, when a civilian-type vehicle driven by an undercover agent was fired on by IRA volunteers without warning, according to Archie Hamilton, then Secretary of State for Defence. Hamilton stated that there were no British casualties.
6 May – Operation Conservation -a British soldier was shot dead when an IRA unit launched a machine gun attack on a British Army observation post near Cullyhanna, County Armagh, during an undercover operation to lure an IRA unit into an ambush. The patrol's survivors were airlifted to safety.
9 October – Two of the IRA's most wanted men Martin McCaughey and Dessie Grew were ambushed and shot dead by 14 Intelligence Company while returning weapons back to an arms cache in a field at Loughgall.
22 November – Undercover British soldiers shot dead INLA volunteer Alexander Patterson as he tried to assassinate an off-duty soldier in Strabane.

1991
3 June 1991 - Coagh ambush – Three IRA Volunteers, Tony Doris (21 years old), Michael "Pete" Ryan (37) (on the run at the time from the RUC since 1981) and Lawrence McNally (39), all from the East Tyrone Brigade were shot and killed by the SAS in ambush using a UDR soldier a bait and a decoy for the unit to attack.

1992
16 February 1992 - Clonoe ambush – Two IRA active service units attacked an RUC station in Coalisland, County Tyrone, with heavy machine guns and assault rifles, all volunteers were from the East Tyrone Brigade.  One of the units was ambushed by the SAS shortly after firing on the RUC base. The Volunteers killed were Patrick Vincent (20 years of age), was shot dead with five bullets whilst still in its cab. Peter Clancy (19) (hit by ten bullets) and Kevin O'Donnell (21) (shot twice) were killed whilst dismounting the DShk on the back of the lorry, Sean O'Farrell (23) was pursued on foot across the church grounds over a distance of 100 yards before being shot dead with five bullets.
25 November – Unarmed Provisional IRA Volunteer Pearse Jordan was shot dead on the Falls Road, Belfast, by an undercover RUC mobile patrol unit. Jordan was given no chance to surrender.

1993 

 12 December 1993 –  Fivemiletown ambush - IRA volunteers from the East Tyrone Brigade ambushed and killed two RUC officers (Constables Andrew Beacom and Ernest Smith) while patrolling on a civilian-type car in Fivemiletown, County Tyrone. The men were part of the RUC Operational Support Unit, which surveilled the Irish border along with the British Army. The unmarked patrol car was on Main Street when it was hit by at least 20 shots from both sides of the road. In a follow up operation a British Army Lynx helicopter received automatic fire from an IRA unit.

1997 
 26 March – 1997 Coalisland attack – Undercover British soldiers shot and seriously injured 19 year-old republican Gareth Doris just seconds after a  home-made bomb was thrown by IRA volunteers to the Army/RUC base at Coalisland, County Tyrone, blowing a hole through the barracks fence. The soldiers left the scene under the protection of the RUC after being cornered by a crowd of civilian residents and after firing shots in the air. Two women were wounded by plastic bullets fired by RUC officers.
10 April – a group of 16 undercover SAS members restrained four IRA volunteers, part of one of the two sniper teams which operated in South Armagh and handed them over to the RUC, after tracking the IRA men to a farm complex. The owner of the farm and two other men were also arrested, but were released on 17 April. Given the imminence of a second IRA ceasefire and the prospective of a political solution to the conflict, the SAS were under strict orders to avoid IRA casualties.
10 June – an active service unit from the IRA's Derry Brigade riding on a van fired upon undercover soldiers on a stationary van on the west side of the river Foyle in Derry. An intensive search recovered the attackers' van at Glendara Park but failed to round up any suspects. No injuries were reported, but 30 families were evacuated from the area as army technical experts performed forensic examinations on the abandoned vehicle.

1998 

 14 January – there was a friendly-fire incident between an RUC patrol and two unmarked British Army vehicles in Belfast after the two civilian-type cars were chased by the RUC. One of the cars crashed at the junction of Crumlin Road and Antrim Road. A female soldier in plain clothes shot an seriously wounded an RUC member in the chest as his patrol approached the vehicle.

See also
Chronology of Provisional Irish Republican Army actions (1970–79)
Chronology of Provisional Irish Republican Army actions (1980–89)
Chronology of Provisional Irish Republican Army actions (1990–99)
Timeline of Irish National Liberation Army actions
Timeline of Ulster Volunteer Force actions
Timeline of Ulster Defence Association actions
List of bombings during the Northern Ireland Troubles and peace process
Timeline of the Troubles in the Republic of Ireland
Timeline of the Northern Ireland Troubles in Britain
Timeline of the Northern Ireland Troubles and peace process

References

The Troubles (Northern Ireland)
Operations involving British special forces
British Army in Operation Banner
Deaths by firearm in Northern Ireland
People killed by security forces during The Troubles (Northern Ireland)
Provisional Irish Republican Army actions
Royal Ulster Constabulary
Special Air Service
Military actions and engagements during the Troubles (Northern Ireland)
Ambushes
The Troubles (Northern Ireland)-related lists